Mohamed Benchaaboun (born 12 November 1961 in Casablanca) is a Moroccan banker, politician and diplomat. He has been Morocco's ambassador to France from 7 January 2022 until his termination in 19 January 2023. He was Minister of Economy, Finance and Administration Reform of Morocco from 2018 to 2021.

Biography 
Benchaaboun graduated from the École Nationale Supérieure des Télécommunications in Paris in 1984. He began his career at Alcatel-Alsthom in Morocco, where he was Director of Strategy, Development and Management Control. He was then put in charge of industrial management, supervising five plants and 800 employees for 10 years.

In 1996, he was appointed Director of the Customs and Indirect Tax Administration.

In September 2003, he was appointed to head the National Telecommunications Regulatory Agency (ANRT) by King Mohammed VI.

He has previously held several positions of responsibility in the private sector, notably as industrial director of the Alcatel-Alsthom group in Morocco. An active member of associations and institutions, he was President of the International Confederation of Popular Banks from 2012 to 2015 and President of the Francophone Telecommunications Regulation Network (FRATEL) between 2005 and 2006.

President of the Banque Centrale Populaire 
In February 2008, King Mohammed VI appointed him President and CEO of the Banque Centrale Populaire du Maroc, a position he held until his appointment as Minister in August 2018.

He was also, at the time, a director of the Union of Arab and French Banks and Chairman of the Board of Directors of the Chaabi Bank of Morocco. He is also Chairman of Maroc Leasing since 2010 and a director of Nexans Maroc.

He is a member of the Economic, Social and Environmental Council and a director of banks and companies, and also a member of the Boards of the Mohammed V Foundation for Solidarity and the Mohammed VI Foundation for the Protection of the Environment.

Minister of Finance 
On August 20, 2018, he was appointed Minister of Economy, Finance and Administration Reform by King Mohammed VI. He replaced Mohamed Boussaïd, who was dismissed on August 1, 2018.

Ambassador of Morocco to France 
On October 17, 2021, he was appointed Ambassador of Morocco to France. He took office on January 7, 2022.On 19 January 2023, the Ministry of Foreign Affairs of Morocco officially announced the termination of Benchaaboun's duties as ambassador.

Director General of the Mohammed VI Investment Fund 
On 18 October 2022, Benchaaboun was appointed as the Director General of the Mohammed VI Investment Fund by King Mohamed VI.

Personal life 
Benchaaboun is married and has two children.

Honors 

 Knight of the Order of the Throne

References 

Living people
1961 births
Moroccan Muslims
Moroccan bankers
Moroccan politicians
Ambassadors of Morocco to France